Miss Belgium 2018 was the 50th edition of the Miss Belgium which was held on January 13, 2018 at the Plopsaland Theater in De Panne, Belgium. Angeline Flor Pua was crowned as Miss Belgium 2018 in the conclusion of the pageant. After her crowning, Angeline Flor Pua underwent racist abuse on social media for not being Belgian enough to represent the country at any international pageant. This is the only edition where the Top 3 represent Belgium at Miss Universe Pageant.

Winner and runners-up

Special awards

Official contestants
30 candidates competed for the title:

References

External links

Miss Belgium
2018 beauty pageants
2018 in Belgium